Thomas Fairgrieve Dorward (27 March 1916, Galashiels – 5 March 1941, Castle Bytham, Lincolnshire) was a Scotland international rugby union player. He died as the result of wounds received during World War II.

Rugby Union career

Amateur career

He played for Gala.

Provincial career

He played for South of Scotland District in their match against the combined North of Scotland District on 20 November 1937.

He was scheduled to play for the Scotland Probables side in the December 1937 trial match but the match was called off due to frost. Instead, Dorward was later in the January 1938 trial, this time as a substitute for the Scotland Possibles side. He came on in the second half.

International career

Death
Pilot Officer Dorward was killed whilst serving with the RAF in World War II.

Family

His brother Arthur Dorward was also capped for Scotland.

See also
 List of Scottish rugby union players killed in World War II

References

Sources

 Bath, Richard (ed.) The Scotland Rugby Miscellany (Vision Sports Publishing Ltd, 2007 )

1916 births
1941 deaths
Gala RFC players
Royal Air Force officers
Royal Air Force personnel killed in World War II
Royal Air Force Volunteer Reserve personnel of World War II
Rugby union players from Galashiels
Scotland international rugby union players
Scotland Possibles players
Scottish rugby union players
South of Scotland District (rugby union) players
Rugby union scrum-halves